The Armenia women's national under-20 basketball team is a national basketball team of Armenia, administered by the Armenian Basketball Federation.
It represents the country in women's international under-20 basketball competitions.

The team finished 16th at the 2022 FIBA U20 Women's European Championship Division B.

See also
Armenia women's national under-18 basketball team
Armenia women's national under-16 basketball team
Armenia men's national under-20 basketball team

References

External links
Archived records of Armenia team participations

Basketball in Armenia
Women's national under-20 basketball teams